Valentine Louis Telegdi (Hungarian: Telegdi Bálint; 11 January 1922 – April 8, 2006) was a Hungarian-born American physicist. He was the Enrico Fermi Distinguished Service Professor of Physics at the University of Chicago before he moved to ETH Zürich.

After retiring from ETH he divided his time between CERN and the California Institute of Technology. Telegdi chaired CERN's scientific policy committee from 1981 to 1983.

According to György Marx he was one of The Martians.

Awards and honours
In 1991 he shared the Wolf Prize in Physics with Maurice Goldhaber.  He was elected a Foreign Member of the Royal Society (ForMemRS) in 2003.

See also
The Martians (scientists)

References

1922 births
2006 deaths
20th-century American physicists
People associated with CERN
Academic staff of ETH Zurich
20th-century Hungarian physicists
Particle physicists
Jewish American scientists
Jewish physicists
Hungarian Jews
Foreign Members of the Royal Society
Foreign Members of the Russian Academy of Sciences
Members of the Hungarian Academy of Sciences
Members of the French Academy of Sciences
Members of the United States National Academy of Sciences
Wolf Prize in Physics laureates
Hungarian emigrants to the United States
20th-century American Jews
21st-century American Jews